Rubrene (5,6,11,12-tetraphenyltetracene) is a red colored polycyclic aromatic hydrocarbon. Rubrene is used as a sensitiser in chemoluminescence and as a yellow light source in lightsticks.

Electronic properties
As an organic semiconductor, the major application of rubrene is in organic light-emitting diodes (OLEDs) and organic field-effect transistors, which are the core elements of flexible displays. Single-crystal transistors can be prepared using crystalline rubrene, which is grown in a modified zone furnace on a temperature gradient. This technique, known as physical vapor transport, was introduced in 1998.

Rubrene holds the distinction of being the organic semiconductor with the highest carrier mobility, reaching 40 cm2/(V·s) for holes. This value was measured in OFETs prepared by peeling a thin layer of single-crystalline rubrene and transferring to a Si/SiO2 substrate.

Crystal structure
Several polymorphs of rubrene are known. Crystals grown from vapor in vacuum can be monoclinic, triclinic, and orthorhombic motifs. Orthorhombic crystals (space group Bbam) are obtained in a closed system in a two-zone furnace at ambient pressure.

Synthesis
Rubrene is prepared by treating 1,1,3-Triphenyl-2-propyn-1-ol with thionyl chloride.

The resulting chloroallene undergoes dimerization and dehydrochlorination to give rubrene.

Redox properties
Rubrene, like other polycyclic aromatic molecules, undergoes redox reactions in solution.  It oxidizes and reduces reversibly at 0.95 V and −1.37 V, respectively vs SCE.  When the cation and anion are co-generated in an electrochemical cell, they can combine with annihilation of their charges, but producing an excited rubrene molecule that emits at 540 nm.  This phenomenon is called electrochemiluminescence.

References

Polycyclic aromatic hydrocarbons
Organic semiconductors
Fluorescent dyes